Up from Down Under is an album by Australian guitarist Tommy Emmanuel. The album was released in 1987 and peaked at number 48 on the ARIA Charts, becoming his first charting album. The album was certified platinum in Australia in 1992.

At the ARIA Music Awards of 1989, the album was nominated for ARIA Award for Best Cover Art but lost to Temple of Low Men by Crowded House.

Track listing

Personnel
Tommy Emmanuel – acoustic guitar and percussions
Graham Jessey – soprano saxophone
Sam McNally – piano and organ

Charts

Certifications

References

1987 albums
Tommy Emmanuel albums